

Hearing healthcare professional qualifications 

Nigeria is a low-income developing country located in Africa.  Currently, there is a lack of information regarding audiological and hearing healthcare in Nigeria.

Current statistics

GNI $Int PPP: per capita gross national income in international dollars; Pop. (000s): population (000s); Auds: total audiologists; Auds/mil. pop: audiologists per million people; ENTs: total ENT surgeons; ENTs/mil. pop: ENT surgeons per million people; Aud phys: audiological physicians; Aud techs: audiological technicians; SLT: speech-language therapists; TOD: teachers of the deaf''

References

Nigerian people in health professions
Nigeria